Samuel-Brisson Ecological Reserve is an ecological reserve in Quebec, Canada. It was established on February 17, 1988.

References

External links
 Official website from Government of Québec

Protected areas of Estrie
Nature reserves in Quebec
Protected areas established in 1988
1988 establishments in Quebec